Patoo Abraham (born 1966) is a Nigerian prostitute and sex workers' rights activist advocating for the legalization of sex work profession in Nigeria and the decriminalization of women in prostitution. As of 2014 she is leader of the African Sex Workers Alliance (ASWA) in Nigeria. She is also the President of Women of Power Initiative (WOPI), an NGO formed for the purpose of improving sex work in Nigeria. She has staged series of protests on the streets of Lagos against the abuse and disregard faced by sex workers.

References

1966 births
Living people
Sex worker activists in Nigeria
Nigerian prostitutes
Nigerian activists
Sex positivism